Larkins may refer to:

People
Dick Larkins (1909–1977), athletic director at the Ohio State University 1947–1970
Ellis Larkins (1923–2002), African-American jazz pianist
Erlana Larkins (born 1986), American professional basketball player
Greta Larkins (born 20th century), Australian actress
John Davis Larkins, Jr. (1909–1990), American federal judge
John Richardson (New Zealand politician) (1810–1878), New Zealand politician and cabinet minister
Nick Larkins (born 20th century), Australian rock musician
Patrick Larkins (1860–1918), American baseball player
Paul Larkins (born 1963), retired English athlete
Peter Larkins (born 1954), Australian doctor, media personality, former athlete
Richard Larkins (born 20th century), Vice-Chancellor and President of Monash University 2003–2009
Sir Frederick Larkins Currie, 2nd Baronet (1823–1900), English baronet
Wayne Larkins (born 1953), English former county cricketer
William Larkins (died 1800), member of the Royal Society, formerly an accountant in Bengal
William Larkins Bernard FRIBA (born 1843), English architect, active in Bristol and London

Other uses
Larkins (1808 ship)

See also
Larkin (disambiguation)
Alvin Larkins Park, park in the Madrona neighborhood of Seattle, Washington